David Leroy Wood (born November 30, 1964) is an American former professional basketball player, who most notably played in the National Basketball Association (NBA).

His NBA career spanned from 1988 until 1997. He played in the Continental Basketball Association with the Rockford Lightning and the Yakima Sun Kings, and also played professionally in France, Spain, and the Philippines.

He played for the US national team in the 1998 FIBA World Championship, winning the bronze medal.

Following his retirement, Wood became interested in politics. A strong supporter of Donald Trump, he attended Trump's rally prior to the incident at the Capitol in 2020.

Career statistics

NBA

Regular season

|-
| align="left" | 1988–89
| align="left" | Chicago
| 2 || 0 || 1.0 || .000 || .000 || .000 || 0.0 || 0.0 || 0.0 || 0.0 || 0.0
|-
| align="left" | 1990–91
| align="left" | Houston
| style="background:#cfecec;" | 82* || 13 || 17.3 || .424 || .311 || .812 || 3.0 || 1.1 || 0.7 || 0.2 || 5.3
|-
| align="left" | 1992–93
| align="left" | San Antonio
| 64 || 2 || 9.3 || .444 || .238 || .836 || 1.5 || 0.5 || 0.2 || 0.2 || 2.4
|-
| align="left" | 1993–94
| align="left" | Detroit
| 78 || 3 || 15.2 || .459 || .449 || .756 || 3.1 || 0.7 || 0.5 || 0.2 || 4.1
|-
| align="left" | 1994–95
| align="left" | Golden State
| 78 || 13 || 17.1 || .469 || .341 || .778 || 3.1 || 0.8 || 0.4 || 0.2 || 5.5
|-
| align="left" | 1995–96
| align="left" | Golden State
| 21 || 0 || 4.6 || .500 || .333 || .875 || 0.8 || 0.2 || 0.1 || 0.0 || 1.0
|-
| align="left" | 1995-96
| align="left" | Phoenix
| 4 || 0 || 8.5 || .167 || .000 || 1.000 || 1.3 || 0.5 || 0.3 || 0.0 || 1.0
|-
| align="left" | 1995–96
| align="left" | Dallas
| 37 || 0 || 17.4 || .435 || .322 || .725 || 3.6 || 0.7 || 0.4 || 0.2 || 4.9
|-
| align="left" | 1996–97
| align="left" | Milwaukee
| 46 || 0 || 5.2 || .526 || .333 || .667 || 0.6 || 0.3 || 0.2 || 0.1 || 1.2
|- class="sortbottom"
| style="text-align:center;" colspan="2"| Career
| 412 || 31 || 13.5 || .449 || .338 || .785 || 2.4 || 0.7 || 0.4 || 0.2 || 3.9
|}

Playoffs

|-
| align="left" | 1990–91
| align="left" | Houston
| 3 || 0 || 14.7 || .667 || 1.000 || .500 || 1.7 || 1.0 || 1.0 || 0.0 || 2.3
|-
| align="left" | 1992–93
| align="left" | San Antonio
| 5 || 0 || 4.0 || .500 || 1.000 || .000 || 0.6 || 0.2 || 0.0 || 0.0 || 1.0
|- class="sortbottom"
| style="text-align:center;" colspan="2"| Career
| 8 || 0 || 8.0 || .571 || 1.000 || .500 || 1.0 || 0.5 || 0.4 || 0.0 || 1.5
|}

College

|-
| align="left" | 1985–86
| align="left" | Nevada
| 28 || - || 28.8 || .516 || .483 || .662 || 6.0 || 1.5 || 0.7 || 0.3 || 8.5
|-
| align="left" | 1986-87
| align="left" | Nevada
| 30 || 30 || 31.7 || .472 || .393 || .726 || 9.4 || 1.2 || 0.8 || 0.8 || 12.1
|- class="sortbottom"
| style="text-align:center;" colspan="2"| Career
| 58 || 30 || 30.3 || .488 || .416 || .702 || 7.7 || 1.3 || 0.7 || 0.6 || 10.4
|}

References

External links

{https://www.sports-reference.com/cbb/players/david-wood-1.html College Stats}

1964 births
Living people
1998 FIBA World Championship players
American expatriate basketball people in France
American expatriate basketball people in Italy
American expatriate basketball people in the Philippines
American expatriate basketball people in Spain
American men's basketball players
Baloncesto Fuenlabrada players
Baloncesto Málaga players
CBA All-Star Game players
CB Gran Canaria players
CB Murcia players
Chicago Bulls players
Dallas Mavericks players
Detroit Pistons players
FC Barcelona Bàsquet players
Golden State Warriors players
Houston Rockets players
Junior college men's basketball players in the United States
Libertas Liburnia Basket Livorno players
Liga ACB players
Limoges CSP players
Milwaukee Bucks players
Nevada Wolf Pack men's basketball players
Philippine Basketball Association imports
Phoenix Suns players
Power forwards (basketball)
Rockford Lightning players
San Antonio Spurs players
Saski Baskonia players
Basketball players from Spokane, Washington
Sportspeople from Vancouver, Washington
Magnolia Hotshots players
Undrafted National Basketball Association players
United States men's national basketball team players